The 1980 South African Open was a men's tennis tournament played on outdoor hard courts in Johannesburg, South Africa that was part of the 1980 Volvo Grand Prix. It was the 77th edition of the tournament and was held from 25 November through 1 December 1980. Seventh-seeded Kim Warwick won the singles title.

Finals

Singles
 Kim Warwick defeated  Fritz Buehning 6–2, 6–1, 6–2

Doubles
 Bob Lutz /  Stan Smith defeated  Heinz Günthardt /  Paul McNamee 6–7, 6–3, 6–4

References

External links
 ITF – Johannesburg tournament details

South African Open
South African Open (tennis)
Open
Sports competitions in Johannesburg
1980s in Johannesburg
November 1980 sports events in Africa
December 1980 sports events in Africa